The Indian Ambassador to the United Arab Emirates is the chief diplomatic representative of India to the United Arab Emirates, housed in Abu Dhabi.

List of Indian Ambassadors to the United Arab Emirates
List of Indian Ambassadors to UAE

See also
Embassy of India, Abu Dhabi

External links
 Ambassadors to the United Arab Emirates

References 

United Arab Emirates
India